Metropolitan of Oulu is the title of the Orthodox bishop of the Oulu Diocese of the Orthodox Church of Finland. The position was created in 1980, when the diocese was created.

History
When Archimandrite Elia was ordained as the Metropolitan of Oulu on January 11, 2015, the Orthodox Church of Finland received a new bishop at the Holy Trinity Cathedral of Oulu. The Archbishop Leo of Karelia were present at the ordination and installation. There was over 300 visitors from all over FInland who participated in the event.

References

Orthodox Church of Finland
Oulu